NGC 1097 (also known as Caldwell 67) is a barred spiral galaxy about 45 million light years away in the constellation Fornax.  It was discovered by William Herschel on 9 October 1790. It is a severely interacting galaxy with obvious tidal debris and distortions caused by interaction with the companion galaxy NGC 1097A. Three supernovae (SN 1992bd, SN 1999eu, and SN 2003B) have been observed in NGC 1097 since 1992.

General information
NGC 1097 is also a Seyfert galaxy. Deep photographs revealed four narrow optical jets that appear to emanate from the nucleus. These have been interpreted as manifestations of the (currently weak) active nucleus. Subsequent analysis of the brightest jet's radio-to-X-ray spectral energy distribution were able to rule out synchrotron and thermal free-free emission. The optical jets are in fact composed of stars. The failure to detect atomic hydrogen gas in the jets (under the assumption that they were an example of tidal tails) using deep 21 cm HI imaging with the Very Large Array radio telescope and numerical simulations led to the current interpretation that the jets are actually the shattered remains of a cannibalized dwarf galaxy.

NGC 1097 has a supermassive black hole at its center, which is 140 million times the mass of the Sun. Around the central black hole is a glowing ring of star-forming regions with a network of gas and dust that spirals from the ring to the black hole. An inflow of material toward the central bar of the galaxy causes new stars to be created in the ring. The ring is approximately 5,000 light-years in diameter, the spiral arms of the galaxy extend tens of thousands of light-years beyond the ring.

NGC 1097 has two satellite galaxies, NGC 1097A and NGC 1097B. Dwarf elliptical galaxy NGC 1097A is the larger of the two.  It is a peculiar elliptical galaxy that orbits 42,000 light-years from the center of NGC 1097. Dwarf galaxy NGC 1097B (5 x 106 solar masses), the outermost one, was discovered by its HI emission, and appears to be a typical dwarf irregular. Little else is known about it.

See also
 NGC 1300, a barred spiral galaxy
 NGC 1232, an intermediate spiral galaxy
 NGC 7479, another example of a barred spiral galaxy

References

External links

 VLT observations – NGC 1097's "dog-leg" tidal stream
 weblore.com – NGC 1097: The Galaxy with the Longest known Optical Jets
 Antilhue-Chile – NGC 1097 in Fornax
 ESO – Very Large Telescope observations of NGC 1097
 Astronomy Picture of the Day – In the Arms of NGC 1097 (2006-12-01)
 The dance of stars and space, 29 December 2012, Thomas Anderson, TG Daily
 

Barred spiral galaxies
Fornax (constellation)
1097
10488
077
067b
Interacting galaxies
17901009
UGCA objects